The Baltimore & Annapolis Trail is a  rail trail in Anne Arundel County, Maryland.  The trail starts at Boulter's Way in Arnold and ends near Baltimore Light Rail's Cromwell Station in Glen Burnie. Starting near Annapolis at Jonas Green Park, the trail passes (northward) through Arnold, Severna Park, Millersville, Pasadena, and Glen Burnie. The Baltimore & Annapolis Trail follows the route of the Baltimore & Annapolis Railroad from which it derives its name. Proposed in 1972 by Jim Hague, it opened on Oct 7, 1990 as the second rail trail in Maryland.

In June 1996, the Baltimore & Annapolis Trail became part of the East Coast Greenway–from Calais, Maine to Key West, Florida. The trail is part of the American Discovery Trail–a trail from the Atlantic coast of Delaware to San Francisco, California.

Trail description
Built on a former rail line through the suburban region between Annapolis and Baltimore the trail is a paved linear park that encompasses .  The trail winds through parks, neighborhoods and natural wooded areas providing scenic views of trees, streams and many historical points.  Two of the major stops on the trail are Severna Park at mile 4.8, and Glen Burnie at mile 12.7. The trail also goes by the Marley Station Mall and the Ranger Station.

Along the trail are historical markers labeled A to Z, which correspond to the Guide to Historical Markers on the B&A Trail, written by park volunteer Barry Miller. The historical markers were designed and placed as an Eagle Scout service project by William Brian Sanders of Boy Scout Troop No. 1785 (of Pasadena, Maryland) in 1993. The A marker is near the Annapolis end of the trail at the Winchester Station House, mile 0.1. Marker Z, at mile 13.3, is for the Sawmill Branch, which was a source of water and power for residents in the early 18th century. The historic markers illustrate the communities the railroad helped develop between Baltimore and Annapolis, and the individual achievements of people within these communities. The trail also has switch boxes and sections of track lining the trail.

The trail is lined with flowerbeds and kiosks and includes a Planet Walk sponsored by NASA.  The Planet Walk is a linear museum with educational displays for each planet and the sun.  The main scenery around the park is forested land, and it contains several bridges.  It is also paralleled by a Baltimore Gas and Electric distribution line for almost all of its length.

The trail ends in the north at Glen Burnie near the intersection of Maryland Routes 176 and 648, where it connects to the BWI Trail Loop, a  loop around the Baltimore–Washington International Thurgood Marshall Airport.  The right-of-way for the former railroad continues to the north as the Baltimore Light Rail, which begins in the south at Cromwell Station.

Since 1998, the trail has hosted the popular B&A Trail Marathon and Half Marathon each spring, which draws approximately 225 marathoners and 650 half marathoners.

History of the railroad
The trail derives its name from the last name the railroad line used before ceasing operations. The railroad started as the Annapolis and Baltimore Short Line on March 9, 1887, though it was more commonly known as the Annapolis Short Line. In 1921 it became the North Shore line of the Washington, Baltimore and Annapolis Electric Railway and in 1935 it began its final incarnation as the B&A.  The railroad ended passenger service in 1950 and freight service stopped going south of Glen Burnie when a trestle washed out in 1969. The property deteriorated and became an eyesore. The WB&A's main line right of way also serves as a rail trail, the Washington, Baltimore and Annapolis Trail.

References

External links
Baltimore and Annapolis Trail Park
Baltimore & Annapolis Trail
Baltimore and Annapolis Trail Park Map
Friends of Anne Arundel County Trails
B&A Marathon Information
B&A Trail page at RailsToTrails.us

Rail trails in Maryland
American Discovery Trail
East Coast Greenway
National Recreation Trails in Maryland
Parks in Anne Arundel County, Maryland
Transportation in Anne Arundel County, Maryland